Laituri is a daba (small town) in the Ozurgeti Municipality of Guria in western Georgia.

References

Cities and towns in Guria